This list of county courthouses in Illinois provides information about each current Illinois county courthouse: name, photograph, city, construction year, and further comments.

Each of the 102 county governments in the U.S. state of Illinois operates out of a building or complex of buildings known as the county's courthouse.  The community in which the courthouse is located is known as the county seat.  The oldest current courthouse is the Putnam County Courthouse, built in 1839, while other courthouses have been built since 2010.  Many courthouses were built following the destruction of previous buildings, either planned or unplanned; however, some former courthouses still stand, many of which have been repurposed as museums or as offices for other governmental agencies.

Fifty-seven of these courthouses were constructed between the end of the Civil War and American entry into the First World War; extant courthouses from this period tend to reflect the Romanesque Revival, Second Empire, and Neoclassical architectural styles, while several older courthouses are Greek Revival buildings, and many twentieth-century courthouses are modernist structures.

List
Thirty-eight courthouses in the state either are listed on the National Register of Historic Places or are located within Register-listed historic districts; these are marked with a †dagger or ‡double dagger respectively, or with both if applicable.

See also
Postville Courthouse State Historic Site, 1950s reproduction of the 1840s Logan County Courthouse

References

External links
Directory of counties
County court information from the Illinois Courts

 
Courthouses, county
Illinois